Marine Air, West Coast (MarAirWest) was a  United States Marine Corps aviation training and administrative command established on 22 January 1943, which was responsible for the administration, training and equipment of the Marine Aviation Units on the West Coast during World War II.

History

Marine Air, West Coast was activated on January 22, 1943 as Marine Fleet Air, West Coast (MarFAirWest) at Naval Air Station San Diego, California under the command of Brigadier General Lewie G. Merritt. Its main purpose was administrating, training and equipping Marine Aviation Units on the West Coast of the United States. The first units of MarFAirWest were assigned in April 1943, when all aviation units from Fleet Marine Force, San Diego Area were reassigned. MarFAirWest was also responsible for providing personnel, equipment and other aviation material to the Aircraft Command, Fleet Marine Force, Pacific.

It was re-designated Marine Air, West Coast in January 1946 and authority for the new designation also consolidated the command with that of the Deputy Commander, Naval Air Bases (Marine Corps Activities), 11th Naval District, formerly situated at Marine Corps Air Station El Toro, Santa Ana, California. Its purpose remained the same - still responsible for supporting Aircraft, Fleet Marine Force, Pacific. The unit was deactivated on October 1, 1947 when the 1st Marine Aircraft Wing returned from overseas duty in China and assumed the commands roles and responsibilities.

Commanding Generals

Subordinate units

Marine Aircraft Group 15
Marine Aircraft Group 23
Marine Aircraft Group 31
Marine Aircraft Group 33
Marine Aircraft Group 35
Marine Aircraft Group 41
Marine Aircraft Group 42
Marine Aircraft Group 43
Marine Aircraft Group 44
Marine Aircraft Group 45
Marine Aircraft Group 46
Marine Aircraft Group 48
Marine Aircraft Group 51
Marine Aircraft Group 94

See also

United States Marine Corps Aviation

Citations

References
Bibliography

Military units and formations in California
Military units and formations of the United States Marine Corps
Military units and formations of the United States Marine Corps in World War II
Allied commands of World War II
Military units and formations established in 1943
Military units and formations disestablished in 1947